Anna Tavano is a paralympic athlete from France competing mainly in category T52 middle-distance events.

Anna competed at the 2000 Summer Paralympics in the 400m, 800m and winning the bronze medal in the 1500m.

References

External links 
 

Year of birth missing (living people)
Living people
French female sprinters
French female middle-distance runners
Paralympic athletes of France
Athletes (track and field) at the 2000 Summer Paralympics
Paralympic bronze medalists for France
Medalists at the 2000 Summer Paralympics
Paralympic medalists in athletics (track and field)
French wheelchair racers